Ilshofen is a town in the district of Schwäbisch Hall, in Baden-Württemberg, Germany. It is located 15 km northeast of Schwäbisch Hall.

References

Towns in Baden-Württemberg
Schwäbisch Hall (district)
Württemberg